Scope Gem was a marketing series title that Warner Brothers used for documentary film shorts produced in Warnercolor and the wide-screen CinemaScope format. Most of these were travelogues.

Overview
Warner Brothers favored block-booking these one- and two-reel documentaries with their wide-screen features. The first official title of the series, Sportsman’s Holiday was released with the CinemaScope feature Battle Cry. 
 
Carl Dudley, who contributed to several of these, also independently produced some in Vistarama (which used 16mm instead of 35mm size, perfected by cameraman Edwin Olsen) for Warner distribution just prior to the official inauguration of the Scope Gem series in 1954–1955. Many of these were processed in Warnercolor.

Narration was handled by longtime veterans Art Gilmore and Marvin Miller, accompanied by the full orchestra scores of Howard Jackson and William Lava. Cedric Francis produced those not handled by Carl Dudley.

Although Universal Pictures, Columbia Pictures and especially 20th Century Fox also released many more shorts in CinemaScope between 1953 and 1964, the Warner product received some of the highest praise in the periodicals of the time. One title by André de la Varre, Time Stood Still, was nominated for an Academy Award. As BoxOffice magazine's reviewer stated on January 8, 1958, of Alpine Glory: “While the Austrian Alps have been filmed before, and well done too, this short subject in color is so beautiful and breathtaking that it can well be the best film ever to deal with the subject.” Although seldom shown on TV on account of their frame format and never released on video, they were nonetheless successfully re-released to theaters through 1967, prompting a young Leonard Maltin to write in similar vocabulary in his The Great Movie Shorts (1972) “These are among the most breathtaking travelogues of all time”.

Unfortunately Warner sharply curtailed feature films using wide-screen formats in 1957, using Technirama for only the most expensive productions. The studio's declining interest in CinemaScope, along with the shrinking market for short films, prompted an abrupt end to the series. During this same period, the concurrently released Joe McDoakes, Robert Youngson documentaries, Looney Tune and Merrie Melodie animated cartoons were released in the more standardized ratio but were equally successful at the box office.

The top cameraman of the series, André de la Varre, left Warner to rejoin the Burton Holmes company that same year, but did supply an occasional travelogue for the studio in the 1960s under its World Wide Adventures logo.

List of titles

See also
André de la Varre
Carl Dudley
List of short subjects by Hollywood studio#Warner Brothers
Travelogue (films)

References
 Liebman, Roy Vitaphone Films – A Catalogue of the Features and Shorts 2003 McFarland & Company
 Maltin, Leonard The Great Movie Shorts 1972 Bonanza Books 
 Motion Pictures 1950-1959 Catalog of Copyright Entries 1960 Library of Congress
BoxOffice back issue scans

External links
 explains the Vistarama process

Notes 

Documentary film series
Warner Bros. short films